Clifton Todd Britt (born November 28, 1969), better known by his stage name Lexington Steele, is an American pornographic actor, director, producer, and former stockbroker. He is the owner of the adult production companies Mercenary Motion Pictures and Black Viking Pictures Inc.

In 2003, Steele became the first actor to receive the AVN Award for Male Performer of the Year three times. He has been inducted into the AVN and XRCO Halls of Fame. Steele has also made several mainstream appearances, including the film Crank: High Voltage (2009) and episodes of Weeds and Nip/Tuck.

Early life
Steele was born and raised in Morristown, New Jersey. After graduating from Morristown High School, he attended Morehouse College in Atlanta, Georgia. After two years, he transferred to Syracuse University in New York. In 1993, Steele graduated from Syracuse's College of Arts and Sciences with Bachelor of Arts degrees in History and African American studies.

Career
Steele started out in finance as a stockbroker trainee at a brokerage firm. After earning his Series 7 trading license, he transitioned to working for Oppenheimer Financial at the World Trade Center. Steele believes he would've been a victim of the September 11 attacks had he continued working as a stockbroker.

In a 2015 interview in AVN magazine, Steele commented about his transition into the adult industry, "Once I was licensed, it opened the door to a whole new recreational side of the industry. The guy who trained me invited me to a party in a hotel suite, and it ended up being a sex party like the ones in [the film] Wolf of Wall Street. It wasn't long before a bigger director from Los Angeles gave me a job and suggested I attend the annual porn industry convention in Las Vegas" and with regard to his decision to switch careers and industries and in consideration for how lucrative securities trading can be, Steele stated, "I tell them it's not like I was already a master of the universe. I was working 12 to 14 hours six days a week. I made six figures, but my quality of life wasn't commensurate".

Steele has said that his stage name came about back during the days when he worked as a stockbroker when he took the subway to visit a client (at that time, he had already decided to move in the adult film industry and use the last name Steele), who was located in Midtown Manhattan and, Steele said, "I got off the subway at Madison [Avenue], [...] on the corner of Madison and Lexington Avenues" [sic], where he was struck by the sound of Lexington as a first name. Steele moved to Los Angeles and joined the industry full-time, initially shooting mainly for companies such as West Coast Productions and director Spunky, before appearing on videotapes produced by Anabolic and Diabolic. At the beginning of 2008, he joined Red Light District Video for a brief period. He appeared in about 1,300 videos in his pornographic career. He is known for his highly productive ejaculation capability and is popular on set.

Directing 
Steele directs and performs exclusively for his own production company, Mercenary Motion Pictures (Headquarters in Encino, California), which he founded in 2008 and serves as chairman and CEO since 2009, with the company reporting annual net profits of $2.6 million in 2011. In 2013, he joined the Evil Angel roster of directors.

Mainstream appearances 
Steele has worked as a model on the side and acted in minor TV roles. He appeared in two episodes of Showtime's Weeds in 2007 (3x07 "He taught me how to drive by" and 3x08 "The two Mrs. Scottsons") playing himself at a movie shoot filming a scene with Jessica Jaymes and Kirsten Price. He appeared in the 2009 feature film Crank: High Voltage and also appeared in an episode of the FX series Nip/Tuck (5x05 "Chaz Darling") as a male escort at a party.

Personal life 

Steele dated for several years and was at one point engaged to adult film actress and director Vanessa Blue. The two appeared together on Playboy TV and in several movies. Blue announced that she would be leaving Steele's production company Mercenary Pictures on June 20, 2006. In 2008, Steele and Blue filed federal lawsuits against each other over the ownership of numerous videos that were released under Mercenary. The suit was ultimately settled in March 2009 after the two met with an alternative dispute resolution jurist.

In October 2016, Steele and French Canadian actress Savana Styles launched Mercenary Enterprises, a division of Mercenary Pictures focusing on fetish-themed productions. In a 2017 interview with AVN, Steele revealed he had been to married to Styles for a year.

In 2019, Steele underwent hip replacement surgery. During recovery, he experienced complications that required another operation. In November 2019, a crowdfunding campaign through GoFundMe was launched to help pay Steele's medical expenses.

Politics
During his time studying African-American studies, Steele developed an awareness of American politics and African-American rights. In 2008, he expressed his support for Barack Obama's presidential campaign.

Filmography

Film

Television

Awards and nominations

References

External links 

 
 
 
 

1969 births
African-American pornographic film actors
American pornographers
American male pornographic film actors
Male actors from New Jersey
Living people
People from New Jersey
Stockbrokers
Syracuse University alumni
Morristown High School (Morristown, New Jersey) alumni
21st-century African-American people
20th-century African-American people